Shaumyan is a rural locality (a khutor) in Pobedenskoye Rural Settlement of Maykopsky District, the Republic of Adygea, Russia. The population was 386 as of 2018. There are 4 streets.

Geography 
Shaumyan is located 9 km northwest of Tulsky (the district's administrative centre) by road. Prichtovsky is the nearest rural locality.

References 

Rural localities in Maykopsky District